Hirtotyphis is a genus of sea snails, marine gastropod mollusks in the family Muricidae, the murex snails or rock snails.

Species
 † Hirtotyphis aoteanus (Vella, 1961) 
 † Hirtotyphis horridus (Brocchi, 1814) 
 † Hirtotyphis panoplus (P. A. Maxwell, 1971) 
 Hirtotyphis trispinosus Houart, 1991

References

 Houart, R, Buge, B. & Zuccon, D. (2021). A taxonomic update of the Typhinae (Gastropoda: Muricidae) with a review of New Caledonia species and the description of new species from New Caledonia, the South China Sea and Western Australia. Journal of Conchology. 44(2): 103–147.

External links
 Jousseaume, F. P. (1880). Division méthodique de la famille des Purpuridés. Le Naturaliste. 2(42): 335-338.

Typhinae